Kalateh-ye Hajji Rahmat (also Romanized as Kalāteh-ye Ḩājjī Raḩmat; also known as Kalāteh-ye Ḩājjī ‘Abd ol Raḩmān) is a village in Salehabad Rural District, Salehabad County, Razavi Khorasan Province, Iran. At the 2006 census, its population was 53, in 11 families.

References 

Populated places in   Torbat-e Jam County